Natalia Denegri (born March 18, 1976 in Buenos Aires, Argentina) producer and writer, residing in Miami, United States. She began her career as an actress and host in Argentina, where she participated in TV shows, plays and a radio program. In the United States, she has won 22 Emmy Awards.

Early career 
Born in Buenos Aires, Natalia Denegri studied Law at the University of Belgrano, in Buenos Aires. Then she studied Communication Science in Miami. Her first acting studies were with Dora Baret in Argentina and in Mexico with Socorro Anadón. She also studied mass communication and public speaking at Arts Media Mass Communication in the city of Miami.

Before settling in the United States of America, Natalia Denegri made her debut in Argentina as an actress in 1998 with the play Verano del Pacu. The following year she starred in the play Zona Roja alongside actors Facha Martel, Delfor Medina, Romerito and Mario Castiglione.

In 2001 she worked as an announcer in the radio program Bienvenidos a Bordo -nominated for the Faro de Oro award in Mar del Plata- and in 2003 she hosted Magazine Verano on Canal 13 in Paraguay. In 2004, she traveled to Mexico to participate in the Mexican program Otro Rollo de Adal Ramones. There, she also worked as a model and in TV commercials. When she returned to her country, in 2006 she was part of the interview program for celebrities Ángel o Demonio on the TVA channel and the sports program Solo Polo, broadcast on Channel 13 of San Luis. In 2012 she returned to Mexico, where she joined the cast of the miniseries Eureka en el Camino.

In 2012 she made her debut with the movie El Pozo (The Well), directed by Rodolfo Carnevale. Filmed in 2006 in the province of San Luis, Argentina, it stars Patricia Palmer, Eduardo Blanco, Adriana Aizenberg, Dora Baret, Gustavo Garzón, Juan Palomino, Ana Fontán and Norma Pons. For her performance, she received the award for Revelation Actress 2012 at the first International Independent Film Festival (MICI), in the city of Guanajuato, Mexico.

Career at United States

Television 
On August 25, 2013, the show Corazones Guerreros had premiered on the CNN Latino television network, which Natalia Denegri hosted with Minda Seco. The show then moved to Mega TV. The program was dedicated to help those most in need, especially children with physical disabilities. It featured a special edition called Double Exile with which Denegri earned a nomination for the News and Documentary Emmy Awards.

For her social and humanitarian journalistic work in this program, Denegri received the prestigious Carteles Award given by the magazine Carteles and Miami Mayor Tomás Regalado gave her the key of the city.

Corazones Guerreros has been running for 10 seasons and won 5 Emmy Awards, two of them in the category for Best Family and Children's Program.

She has produced various documentaries for Corazones Guerreros, such as Comedores y merenderos argentinos: espejos de las crisis and La Niña 48914, about the story of Eugenia Unger, a Holocaust survivor who founded the Buenos Aires and Miami Holocaust Museums.

On March 13, 2015, she premiered the television program Atrevidas on MiraTV, where she develops feminine themes related to fashion, beauty, health and entertainment.

Documentaries 
Denegri was the host of the two part documentary Doble Exilio, produced by Nelson Bustamante and Elizabeth Hernández. The first part shows stories of Cubans who have had to emigrate twice, first from Cuba to Venezuela and then from Venezuela to the United States. She won the AIPE Golden Latin Awards 2015 and the Mayor of Doral, Luis Boria, gave her an honorary medal. The second part, produced by Bustamente and Elizabeth Hernández and directed by Félix Morante and Jefferson Cárdenas, deals with Venezuelan immigration. Thanks to this documentary, Denegri won her first Emmy in 2015.

On July 12, 2016, MiraTV premiered the documentary Que Todo El Mundo Se Entere presented by Denegri and Nelson Bustamante on the social, economic and humanitarian crisis in Venezuela. On the same year, she received an Emmy nomination for the documentary Pon El Foco En La Carretera about road-safety education.

In 2017 she produced RCTV 10 Años Después, a documentary that develops the closure of the Venezuelan channel RCTV after President Hugo Chávez denied the renewal of the concession. It was hosted by Denegri under the executive production of Bustamante and it was an Emmy winner. She then made Buscando a Dios, a documentary about the pilgrimage of a man suffering from cancer that won an Emmy in the "Religious Program" category.

The documentary Libre, winner of the 2018 Suncoast Regional Emmy Awards in the "Human Interest" category, tells the story of Venezuelan actress Michelle De Andrade, who left her home at the age of thirteen to live on the streets and later developed a career in the circus and as an actress.

Natalia Denegri won another Suncoast Regional Emmy Award in 2018 in the "Human Interest" category for the documentary Más allá de mis manos, about the life of Franklin Mejías, a boy who lost his limbs after being attacked by bacteria.

Una historia de amor is about Sabrina and Hernán, two Argentine boys with Down syndrome who are struggling for their relationship. This documentary won the 2019 Suncoast Regional Emmy in the category Human interest: program feature/segment.

Natalia Denegri filmed a documentary called Innoncents during her trip to the La Guajira Desert in Colombia, where she brought donations to the Wayuú community for the construction of their first schools. The film was the winner of the 2019 Suncoast Regional Emmy in the "Human interest" category. It was followed by a special entitled "Proyecto Guajira" which was aired on her television program, Corazones Guerreros. It won the 2020 Suncoast Regional Emmy Award in the category Best children's/youth program where it showed a group of young people who went to the Colombian Guajira to assist the Wayuú community.

In 2019 she won a Suncoast Regional Emmy in the Documentary Topic category for Venezuela: the Truth which, that reflects the humanitarian crisis in Venezuela.

Periodismo en Dictadura received two awards at the 2020 Suncoast Regional Emmy for Best Documentary and Best Audiovisual Editing. It is a short documentary that reflects the vision of Venezuela that journalist Luis Olavarrieta has.

Winner of a Suncoast Regional Emmy, in the “Community/Public Service Documentary” category, Super Héroes is a children’s tribute to the doctors and nurses who cared for people during the COVID-19 pandemic.

Australia Beyond the Fires is a documentary that intertwines the story of the fires that hit Australia at the end of 2019 with that of firefighter Marco Vega Borjas, who managed to overcome cancer. It was nominated for a Suncoast Emmy in the “Environment” category in 2020.

Natalia also produced A Day Under My Skin a documentary that tells the story of Moin, an English boy who fights against a skin condition that prevents him from having a normal life.

Away From Home is a documentary about the war in Syria told from the point of view of refugees in Lebanon. Denegri made another documentary focused on Syrian refugee children within Corazones Guerreros titled Dreams, interrupted.

She also made in 2020 Su Señoría: Leandro Denegri about María Denegri's struggle to find the murderers of her son Leandro, which occurred in 2003 in Argentina during a robbery. For this documentary, she interviewed Argentinean ministers who collaborated to find the culprits, such as the current Minister of Security Aníbal Fernández, the former governor of the province of Buenos Aires Felipe Solá and the current President of the Argentine Nation, Alberto Fernández.

In the other hand, Bilma Corazón: La Lucha De Una Madre Contra El Paco shows how the cocaine paste affects the life of the poorest neighborhoods in Argentina. It was made from the perspective of Bilma Acuña, a woman who does community work in Ciudad Oculta, in the province of Buenos Aires. Shen then made Entre Cuatro Paredes, that shows the last 24 hours in prison of Luis Sosa, a man who was in prison for 18 years and who is preparing to be released.

The documentary Hope shows the disaster caused by Hurricane Maria on the island of Puerto Rico and the solidarity trip organized by Denegri and the Hassenfeld Family Foundation to assist the victims. It was made in 2017 with EPIC in motion, the production company of Alain Maiki and Henry Zakka, and received nominations at the Manhattan Film Festival, Utah Film Festival and the International Filmmaker Festival in Nice, France.

Films 
In 2017, Natalia Denegri produced and co-starred in the film Uma, which won the Best Foreign Film Award at the Burbank International Film Festival in Los Angeles. It was written by Doug Olivares and filmed in Italy.

Bibliography 
In 2017 she published her first book called Corazones Guerreros, historias de vida. The book is a compilation of the best stories that have been presented in her show Corazones Guerreros.

In 2018 she edited her second book, Corazón de Mamá. Guerreras por nuestros hijos, about her experience as a first time mother.

Awards 
She obtained her first Emmy in 2015 together with host Nelson Bustamante and producer Elizabeth Hernández for her documentary Doble Exilio Part 2 in the News & Documentary category.

In 2017 she won another two Emmys, one for her work on RCTV, 10 años después and the second one in the category "Religious Program", where she competed with five other submissions, for Buscando a Dios. In 2018, she won another four awards, becoming the first Argentine to win seven Emmys.

She received the Carteles award in Miami for her journalistic, social and humanitarian work with her program Corazones Guerreros first broadcast on the CNN Latino channel and then on Mega TV.

In 2017, she was recognized by the United States Congress for her community work in helping those affected by Hurricane Maria in Puerto Rico. That same year she was named Cultural Ambassador and presenter of the International Independent Film Festival of Pozos, Mexico.

In 2018, she was included in the list of the 25 Most Powerful Hispanic Women of People En Español magazine along with Salma Hayek and Thalía.

In 2019 she won six 2019 Suncoast Regional Emmy Awards, where she includes four personal and two as executive producer of the documentaries Dreams, interrupted and For the Children, by the Children.

In 2021 she was selected by Hola! magazine as one of the most influential and empowered Latinas in its “Latina Top 100 Powerhouse” ranking, in the Latina Changemaker category.

At the end of 2021, she won five Suncoast Emmys, including a personal one as an executive producer in the category Best Human Interest Documentary. With 22 awards, she became the most Emmy Award-winning Latina in history.

Philanthropy 
Natalia is the official spokesperson for the Hassenfeld Family Foundation and, through her Corazones Guerreros show, carries out philanthropic tasks and humanitarian missions inside and outside the United States. They have made humanitarian trips to Colombia, Venezuela, Argentina, Cuba and Puerto Rico.

In 2015, Miami Mayor Tomás Regalado awarded her the key to the City.

In 2017, she was recognized by the United States Congress for her humanitarian work with the Hassenfeld Family Foundation with those affected by Hurricane Maria in Puerto Rico.

In August 2021, she was recognized by the mayor of the city of Miami, Francis X. Suarez, for her social work.

In 2022 she partnered with NGOs Little Lighthouse Foundation and Global Empowerment Mission to help Ukrainian refugees that had escaped their country during Russia’s invasion.

References

External links
 El Pozo movie's official website
 Natalia Denegri's official website
 AUPA website
 Mira TV website
 Natalia Denegri at IMDb
 Trinitus Productions website

1976 births
Living people
Actresses from Buenos Aires
Argentine expatriates in the United States
Argentine film actresses
Argentine people of Italian descent
Argentine television actresses
Argentine television producers
Argentine women television producers
Regional Emmy Award winners
21st-century Argentine actresses